GOALTV was a football network offering Asia audiences coverage of European football. This included live games from three major European leagues as well as behind-the-scenes access to three Premier League clubs in England, Manchester City, Chelsea  and Liverpool, in addition to FC Barcelona & Real Madrid FC of Spain.

Goal TV has closed down on 1 June 2013 in Singapore via SingTel mio TV Service and other Pay TV Providers in South East Asia with effect from 2 June 2013 and 3 June 2013 for website.

Programs on Goal TV 1
 Real Madrid TV
 Barça TV
 City TV
 Eredivisie
 FCB TV
 Manchester City TV
 RMTV
 Scottish Premier League
 Football League Championship
 Football League Cup
 Ligue 1

Programs on Goal TV 2
 Barca TV
 Chelsea TV
 City TV
 LFC TV
 Bayern Munich TV
 Eredivisie
 Football League Championship

On air

References

External links
Official website

Sports television networks
Cable television in Hong Kong
1993 establishments in Hong Kong
Television channels and stations established in 1993
Television channels and stations disestablished in 2013